Rudolph White (born June 23, 1953) is an American former basketball player. He was a 6'2" (1.88 m), 195 lb (88.5 kg) guard born in Silver City, New Mexico and attended Arizona State University and played in the National Basketball Association (NBA) from 1975 to 1981 with three teams.

White was selected in the third round of the 1975 NBA Draft by the Houston Rockets and in the second round of the 1975 ABA Draft by the Spirits of St. Louis.

References

External links 
NBA stats @ basketballreference.com

1953 births
Living people
21st-century African-American people
African-American basketball players
American men's basketball players
Arizona State Sun Devils men's basketball players
Basketball players from New Mexico
Houston Rockets draft picks
Houston Rockets players
Golden State Warriors players
People from Silver City, New Mexico
Point guards
Seattle SuperSonics players
Spirits of St. Louis draft picks
20th-century African-American sportspeople